Jaroslav Šmíd (born 10 November 1955) is a Czech volleyball player. He competed in the men's tournament at the 1980 Summer Olympics.

References

1955 births
Living people
Czech men's volleyball players
Olympic volleyball players of Czechoslovakia
Volleyball players at the 1980 Summer Olympics
Sportspeople from Karlovy Vary